Following is a list of all Article III United States federal judges appointed by President Woodrow Wilson during his presidency. In total Wilson appointed 76 Article III federal judges, including 3 Justices to the Supreme Court of the United States, 20 judges to the United States Courts of Appeals, and 53 judges to the United States district courts.

Wilson made additional appointments to Article I tribunals.  He made 4 appointments to the United States Court of Customs Appeals. He also made 4 appointments to the Board of General Appraisers, the forerunner of the United States Customs Court and later the United States Court of International Trade.

United States Supreme Court justices

Courts of appeals

District courts

Specialty courts (Article I)

United States Court of Claims

Board of General Appraisers

Notes

Renominations

References
General

 

Specific

Sources
 Federal Judicial Center

Wilson